Khúc Thừa Mỹ (chữ Hán: 曲承美; pinyin: Qū Chéngměi; governed: 918–923 or 918–930) was a self-declared jiedushi of Tĩnh Hải quân (modern northern Vietnam) during the later part of the Third Chinese domination of Vietnam, when China entered the chaotic Five Dynasties period. He succeeded his father Khúc Hạo and tried to maintain northern Vietnam's autonomy. His rule was officially recognized by the Later Liang, thus he came to conflict with Liu Yan, the ruler of Southern Han. The Southern Han invaded in 930, capturing the capital Đại La (present-day Hanoi) with no resistance, and Khúc Thừa Mỹ was taken to Canton, where he was placed under comfortable house arrest. Chinese rule in Vietnam was thereby reestablished.

References

|- style="text-align: center;"

|-

|-

|-

Later Liang (Five Dynasties) jiedushi of Jinghai Circuit
Year of death unknown
Year of birth unknown